Joachim Philipp Maria Meyerhoff (born 1967 in Homburg) is a German actor, director, and writer.

Life 
Joachim Meyerhoff is the youngest son of Hermann Meyerhoff, who was the director of the psychiatric clinic in Hesterberg, Schleswig-Holstein, since 1972. The director's house was on the grounds of the clinic. Joachim spent his childhood with two older brothers on the clinic grounds in Schleswig-Holstein. At 17, he spent a year in Laramie, Wyoming. During this time, his middle brother was killed in an automobile accident. After his return, Joachim Meyerhoff completed his high school studies (Abitur) and would have performed his compulsory community service as a swimming-pool supervisor at the Rechts der Isar Hospital in Munich. Instead, he completed his training as an actor between 1989 and 1992 at the Otto Falckenberg School of the Performing Arts in Munich. After commitments at the Staatstheater Kassel, in Bielefeld, Dortmund and the Bühnen der Stadt Köln, he joined the Maxim Gorki Theater, Berlin in 2001, where he also frequently directed. In 2002, he moved to the Deutsche Schauspielhaus in Hamburg, where he stayed until 2005. He acted there in productions by Volker Hesse, Thomas Langhoff, Stefan Otteni, Karin Beier, Sebastian Hartmann and Günter Krämer. Since September 2005, Joachim Meyerhoff has been an ensemble member of the Burgtheater in Vienna. At the beginning of the 2013 season, he returned to the Deutsche Schauspielhaus under the leadership of artistic director Karin Beier. However, he remains a member of the Viennese Burgtheater.

In addition to his work as an actor, Meyerhoff has frequently conceived his own programs. His project Alle Toten fliegen hoch regularly played at the Burgtheater Vienna to a full audience. In this autobiographical, six-part program, Meyerhoff tells the story of his life and family. He tells of his siblings, his grandparents in Munich, his father, the director of a child and youth psychiatric clinic in Schleswig, his upbringing on the grounds on the institution, and his exchange year in America. He was invited to perform the first three parts of the series at the Berliner Theatertreffen 2009. In 2011, the first part (Amerika) was published as a book by Kiepenheuer & Witsch.

In 2006 and 2007, Meyerhoff was nominated for the Nestroy-Preis. He was chosen as Actor of the Year in 2007 for playing the role of Hamlet at the Schauspielhaus Zürich and the role of Benedict in Jan Bosse's production of Shakespeare's Much Ado about Nothing. He received the 2011 Franz-Tumler-Literaturpreis and the 2012 advancement award of the Bremer Literaturpreis for his novel Alle Toten fliegen hoch. Amerika. In 2014, he was recognized for his work in the role of Arnolphe in The School for Wives (Schauspielhaus Hamburg, producer: Herbert Fritsch) with the Rolf-Mares-Preis. In 2015, his interpretation of Kreon in Jette Steckel's production of Antigone at the Burgtheater was praised by the public and press.

Meyerhoff is the grandson of the actor Inge Birkmann, whose second marriage was to the philosopher Hermann Krings. Meyerhoff has two daughters by Christiane von Poelnitz, who is an actor at the Burgtheater.

In 2017 Meyerhoff suffered a stroke.

Roles in theater 
Deutsches Schauspielhaus Hamburg
 2002: Hedda Gabler by Henrik Ibsen, director: Sandra Strunz
 2003: As You Like It by William Shakespeare, director: Jürgen Gosch
 2002: Vorher/Nachher by Roland Schimmelpfennig, director: Jürgen Gosch
 2004: Waiting for Godot by Samuel Beckett, director: Jan Bosse
 2004: The Broken Jug by Heinrich von Kleist, director: Jürgen Gosch
 2004: Mephisto in Faust, Part I by Johann Wolfgang Goethe, director: Jan Bosse
Schauspielhaus Zürich
 2007: Hamlet by William Shakespeare, role: Hamlet, director: Jan Bosse
Burgtheater Vienna
 2005: Wir wollen den Messias jetzt oder Die beschleunigte Familie by Franzobel, role: Jesus, Regie: Karin Beier
 2005: Philistines by Maxim Gorky, role: Tetrew, director: Karin Beier
 2006: Torquato Tasso by Johann Wolfgang von Goethe, role: Alfons II, Duke of Ferrara, director: Stephan Kimmig
 2006: Much Ado About Nothing by William Shakespeare, role: Benedikt, director: Jan Bosse, Salzburger Festspiele
 2006: Höllenangst by Johann Nestroy, role: Thuming, director: Martin Kušej (coproduction with the Salzburger Festspielen)
 2007: The Tempest by William Shakespeare, role: Ariel, director: Barbara Frey
 2007: The Brothers Karamazov by Fyodor Dostoyevsky, role: Iwan, director: Nicolas Stemann
 2008: God of Carnage by Yasmina Reza, role: Alain Reille, director: Dieter Giesing
 2008: Who's Afraid of Virginia Woolf? by Edward Albee, role: George, director: Jan Bosse
 2009: Mea Culpa – Eine ReadyMadeOper by Christoph Schlingensief, director: Christoph Schlingensief
 2009: Faust I in place of the injured Gert Voss, director: Matthias Hartmann
 2009: Faust II, director: Matthias Hartmann
 2010: Othello by William Shakespeare, role: Othello, director: Jan Bosse
 2010: Twelfth Night by William Shakespeare, role: Malvolio, director: Matthias Hartmann
 2011: Professor Bernhardi by Arthur Schnitzler, role: Prof. Bernhardi, director: Dieter Giesing
 2011: The Commune, by Mogens Rukov, Thomas Vinterberg role: Erik, director: Thomas Vinterberg
 2012: Robinson Crusoe, role: Robinson Crusoe, director: Jan Bosse
 2012: Der Ignorant und der Wahnsinnige by Thomas Bernhard, role: Doktor
 2013: Tartuffe by Molière, role: Tartuffe, producer: Luc Bondy
 2014: Dantons Tod by Georg Büchner, role: Danton, director: Jan Bosse
 2015: The Imaginary Invalid by Molière, role: Argan, director: Herbert Fritsch
 2016: Bella Figura by Yasmina Reza, role: Boris, director: Dieter Giesing
 2017: Die Welt im Rücken by Thomas Melle, director: Jan Bosse

As director 
 2001: Venedikt Yerofeyev's Moskau – Petuschki
 2003: Erich Kästner's Fabian
 2005: Wann wird es endlich wieder so, wie es nie war?
 2006: Marathon: 2:04:55
 2007–2009: Alle Toten fliegen hoch (parts 1–3 were invited to the Berliner Theatertreffen 2009)
 2007: Alle Toten fliegen hoch, Teil 1: Amerika
 2008: Alle Toten fliegen hoch, Teil 2: Zuhause in der Psychiatrie
 2008: Alle Toten fliegen hoch, Teil 3: Die Beine meiner Großmutter
 2008: Alle Toten fliegen hoch, Teil 4: Theorie und Praxis
 2009: Alle Toten fliegen hoch, Teil 5: Heute wärst Du zwölf
 2009: Alle Toten fliegen hoch, Teil 6: Ach diese Lücke, diese entsetzliche Lücke

Roles on film 
 2005: Tatort – Stille Tage, director: Thomas Jauch
 2005: Doppelter Einsatz – Seitensprung in den Tod, director: Peter Patzak
 2011: , as American Director
 2017: Bibi & Tina – Tohuwabohu total!, director: Detlev Buck

Literary works 

 Amerika. (Alle Toten fliegen hoch. No. 1), Cologne 2011, 
 Wann wird es endlich wieder so, wie es nie war. (Alle Toten fliegen hoch. No. 2), Cologne 2013, 
 Ach, diese Lücke, diese entsetzliche Lücke. (Alle Toten fliegen hoch. No. 3), Cologne 2015, 
 Die Zweisamkeit der Einzelgänger. (Alle Toten fliegen hoch. No. 4), Cologne 2017, 
 Hamster im hinteren Stromgebiet. (Alle Toten fliegen hoch. No. 5), Cologne 2020,

Prizes 
 2006: Nestroy Theatre Prize – Nominated – Best Actor for Schauspielerische Gesamtleistung in der Saison 2005/06
 2007: Nestroy Theatre Prize – Nominated – Best Actor for Benedict in Much Ado About Nothing
 2007: Schauspieler des Jahres – Critic's Prize from the trade journal Theater heute
 2011: Nestroy Theatre Prize – Nominated – Best Actor for Professor Bernhardi in Professor Bernhardi
 2012: Nestroy Theatre Prize – Best Actor for Erek in The Commune
 2012: Advancement Prize of the Bremer Literaturpreis for his novel Alle Toten fliegen hoch. Amerika
 2014: Rolf-Mares-Preis – Outstanding service as actor in The School of Wives, Schauspielhaus Hamburg
 2016: Nicolas Born Prize (Inaugural prize)
 2016: Euregio-Schüler-Literaturpreis for Wann wird es endlich wieder so, wie es nie war
 2017: Carl Zuckmayer Medal.
 2017: Deutscher Hörbuchpreis in the category "Best Discussion" for his reading Ach, diese Lücke, diese entsetzliche Lücke.
 2017: Election to the Academy of Arts, Berlin
 2017: Schauspieler des Jahres
 2019: Gustaf Gründgens Prize

References 

1967 births
Living people
German male film actors
Members of the Academy of Arts, Berlin
21st-century German novelists
People from Homburg, Saarland